Jan Ericson was born in 1961, and is a member of the Swedish Parliament for the moderate party. He is a member of
the Committee on Labor Market. Ericson is on leave from his work as jurist at Skandinaviska Enskilda Banken.
He lives in Hällingsjö and is elected in the constituency of Sjuhärad, Västra Götalands län.

References 

Riksdagen: Jan Ericson (m)

Living people
1961 births
Members of the Riksdag 2006–2010
Members of the Riksdag 2010–2014
Members of the Riksdag 2014–2018
Members of the Riksdag 2018–2022
Members of the Riksdag 2022–2026
Members of the Riksdag from the Moderate Party